The 1949 Men's World Weightlifting Championships were held in Scheveningen, Netherlands from September 4 to September 6, 1949. There were 38 men in action from 13 nations.

Medal summary

Medal table

References
Results (Sport 123)
Weightlifting World Championships Seniors Statistics

External links
International Weightlifting Federation

World Weightlifting Championships
World Weightlifting Championships
International sports competitions hosted by the Netherlands
World Weightlifting Championships
20th century in The Hague
Weightlifting in the Netherlands